Vladimír Ekhardt (born 17 January 1958) is a former football player from Slovakia.

He coached Spartak Trnava.

References

External links
 Coach World Ranking profile

1958 births
Living people
Slovak footballers
Slovak football managers
Slovak expatriate footballers
FC Baník Prievidza players
FC DAC 1904 Dunajská Streda players
FC Spartak Trnava players
ŠK Slovan Bratislava players
FC Spartak Trnava managers
Sportspeople from Topoľčany
Association football midfielders